Ivan Flores (born January 30, 1996) is a Mexican luchador professional wrestler, better known by his ring name Niño Hamburguesa. He currently signed to Lucha Libre AAA Worldwide (AAA). He is a former AAA World Mixed Tag Team Champion with Big Mami.

Professional wrestling career

Lucha Libre AAA Worldwide (2014–present)
On June 19, 2017, in Nuevo Laredo, Hamburguesa and Mami competed for the AAA World Mixed Tag Team Championship defeating Venum and Lady Shani to win the title. On May 31, 2018, in Pachuca, Hamburguesa and Mami had their first defense defeating Villano III Jr. & La Hiedra. Their second defense took place on August 25 in Triplemanía XXVI who defeated Dinastía & Lady Maravilla, El Hijo del Vikingo & Vanilla Vargas and Angelikal & La Hiedra. Their third defense took place on March 16 in Rey de Reyes who defeated Maravilla and Villano III Jr., where the feud between Maravilla and Mami began. On August 3, 2019, in Triplemanía XXVII, Hamburguesa and Mami lost their titles to Maravilla and Villano, where it was a four-way tag team match, which also included the teams of Australian Suicide & Vanilla and Sammy Guevara & Scarlett Bordeaux in their fourth defense, ending their 775-day reign, being the second longest reign of the championship.

Championships and accomplishments
Lucha Libre AAA Worldwide
AAA World Mixed Tag Team Championship (1 time) – with Big Mami
Copa Triplemanía Regía (2019)
Copa Triplemanía XXX (2022, Tijuana)
 Pro Wrestling Illustrated
Ranked No. 474 of the top 500 singles wrestlers in the PWI 500 in 2022

References

External links 
 

1996 births
Living people
Mexican male professional wrestlers
AAA World Mixed Tag Team Champions